Ohev Sholom Temple, now known as B'Nai Sholom Congregation, is a historic synagogue located at 949 10th Avenue in Huntington, Cabell County, West Virginia. Designed by the Charleston, West Virginia architectural firm of Meanor and Handloser, it was built in 1925 for Congregation Ohev Shalom, which had been formed in 1887. In 1978 B'Nai Sholom Congregation was formed by the merger of Ohev Shalom and B’nai Israel, an Orthodox synagogue which had been formed in 1910. On March 17, 1994, the building was added to the National Register of Historic Places. B'Nai Sholom continues today as an active congregation affiliated with both the Reform and Conservative streams of Judaism.

External links
 B'Nai Sholom Congregation website

References

Properties of religious function on the National Register of Historic Places in West Virginia
Synagogues in West Virginia
Reform synagogues in the United States
Conservative synagogues in the United States
Synagogues completed in 1925
Buildings and structures in Huntington, West Virginia
National Register of Historic Places in Cabell County, West Virginia
Synagogues on the National Register of Historic Places
Byzantine Revival architecture in West Virginia
Romanesque Revival architecture in West Virginia